The following is a list of Portuguese films that were first released in 2016.

Highest-grossing films
The following is a list of the 10 highest-grossing domestic films in Portugal that were first released in 2016, as of December 28, 2016, according to the Instituto do Cinema e do Audiovisual (Institute of Cinema and Audiovisual).

List of films

See also
2016 in Portugal

References

2016
Lists of 2016 films by country or language
2016 in Portugal